Ixodia may refer to:

 Ixodia (bird), a genus of bird in the family Pycnonotidae
 Ixodia (plant), a genus of plants in the family Asteraceae